This list of cemeteries in Sonoma County, California includes currently operating, historical (closed for new interments), and defunct (graves abandoned or removed) cemeteries, columbaria, and mausolea in Sonoma County, California. It does not include pet cemeteries. Selected interments are given for notable people.



See also

 List of cemeteries in California

Footnotes

Further reading

External links
 Sonoma County cemeteries at Find a Grave
 Sonoma County at Histopolis

Cemeteries
 
History of Sonoma County, California
Geography of Sonoma County, California
Cemeteries in California by county
Sonoma